Gran Chaco is a province in the eastern parts of the Bolivian department Tarija. The province voted to become an autonomous region on 6 December 2009.

Location
Gran Chaco province is one of six provinces in the Tarija Department. It is located between 21° 00' and 22° 17' south and between 62° 16' and 64° 18' west.

The province borders Chuquisaca Department in the north, Burnet O'Connor Province in the north-west, Aniceto Arce Province in the south-west, Argentina in the south, and Paraguay in the east.

The province extends over 200 km from north to south, and 200 km from east to west.

Population
The main language of the province is Spanish, spoken by 98.4%, while 11.5% of the population speak Quechua, 3.0% speak Aymara, and 2.7% Guaraní.

The population increased from 74,612 inhabitants (1992 census) to 116,318 (2001 census), an increase of 55.9%. - 41.9% of the population are younger than 15 years old.

50.7% of the population have no access to electricity, 41.1% have no sanitary facilities (1992).

19.1% of the population are employed in agriculture, 1.4% in mining, 8.3% in industry, 71.2% in general services (2001).

86.8% of the population are Catholics, 9.4% are Protestants (1992).

Division
The province comprises three municipalities:
Caraparí Municipality
Villamontes Municipality
Yacuiba Municipality

Places of interest 
 Aguaragüe National Park and Integrated Management Natural Area
 Tariquía Flora and Fauna National Reserve

See also 
 Provinces of Bolivia

External links
General map of province
Detailed map of province towns and rivers
Population data (Spanish)
Región Autónoma Chaco Tarijeño - Ministerio de Autonomías

Provinces of Tarija Department
Gran Chaco